Crusade is the second book of the Destroyermen series. Matthew Reddy, and the crew of USS Walker (DD-163), are reunited with the destroyer USS Mahan (DD-102), and set out to fight the Grik. Reddy and Walker'''s marine detachment, continue training the Lemurians to defend themselves and take the war to the Grik. The Grik have now taken over the ship that was chasing them, the Japanese battlecruiser Amagi.

Plot Synopsis
Lieutenant Commander Matthew Reddy, and the crew of USS Walker (DD-163), have located USS Mahan (DD-102), and are preparing to take the fight to the Grik. Reddy personally leads the first land assault against the Griks to defend a warrior tribe of Monkey-Cats. Amagi'' is discovered by aerial reconnaissance in a Grik Armada on an obvious heading to Walker's Location.  In a repeat of actual history Reddy orchestrates another evacuation of Surabaya. Surface action ensues.

External links
 

2008 novels
American alternate history novels
Destroyermen and Artillerymen